born April 8, is a Japanese manga artist and illustrator from Nagano Prefecture.

She illustrates yaoi light novels and manga. She chose Temari as her pen name since the town she is from, Matsumoto, Nagano Prefecture, is known for making temari.

Works

Manga
 , one volume, 2003
  (Story by Barugo Hotaka), one volume, 2003
 , one volume, 2004
 , two volumes, 2004
 , one volume, 2004
 , one volume, 2005
  (Story by Tomo Takabayashi) 16 volumes (ongoing) 2005
  2011

Illustrations
Kyo Kara Maoh! series(Story by Tomo Takabayashi)
 (Story by Tatsuki Shindou)
　(Story by Satomi Kikawa)

References

External links

Temari Web

Manga artists from Nagano Prefecture
Year of birth missing (living people)
Living people
Women manga artists
Japanese female comics artists
Japanese illustrators
Japanese women illustrators
Female comics writers
Japanese women writers
Japanese writers
People from Matsumoto, Nagano